Manoel Tobias da Cruz Júnior (born 7 April 1971), commonly known as Manoel Tobias, is a former futsal player.

Honours

Clubs
 Fortaleza City Trophy: Champion 1992, 1993
 Pernambuco State: Champion 1990
 Champion of Paraná State: 1992, 1993
 Champion of Rio Grande do Sul State: 1994, 1995
 Brazilian Champion of State Squads 1992, 1996
 Champion of National Circuit: 1992, 1995
 Brazilian Championship:1991, 1993, 1994, 1995
 South American Club Futsal Championship: champion 1993
 Intercontinental Futsal Cup: champion 1996,1998
 Belo Horizonte Metropolitan: Champion 1998, 1999
 Campeonato Mineiro de Futsal:1998, 1999
 Liga Futsal:1996, 1999, 2000
 Taça Brasil de Futsal:1991,1995, 2000
 Campeonato do Rio de Janeiro de Futsal: 2000
 Campeonato Carioca Metropolitano: 2000
 Copa Rio/São Paulo/Minas: 2000, 2001

Brazilian Squad
 Pan American Cup: Champion 1991
 South American Qualificacion: Champion 1992,1996, 2000
 Mundialito: Champion 1995,1996,1998, 2001, 2002
 Rio de Janeiro Cup: Champion 1997,1998
 Copa América de Futsal: champion 1995, 1997, 1998, 1999
 FIFA Futsal World Cup: champion 1992, 1996
 Pré-Mundial de Futsal:2004
Latin Cup: 2003
Tigers 5 – Singapore: 1999, 2001
Egypt Tournament: 2002
Thailand Tournament: 2003
Odesur Games:2002

Individual
 3x Best Player of the World: 2000, 2001, 2002
 2x Best Player on the FIFA Futsal World Cup: 1996, 2000
 2X Topscorers Fifa Futsal World Cup:1996 (14 goals), 2000 (19 goals)
 FIFA Futsal World Cup goals: 43 goals in 4 editions

External links
Futsalplanet.com
Official site

1971 births
Living people
Brazilian men's futsal players
FS Cartagena players
Sportspeople from Pernambuco